Kuhi may refer to:

 Kuhi, a town and a tehsil in Umred subdivision of Nagpur district in Nagpur, India
 kuhi stones carved with haiku poems
 Kuhi, Hormozgan, a village in Iran
 Kuhi, Bastak, a village in Hormozgan Province, Iran
 Kuhi, Razavi Khorasan, a village in Iran
 Kuhi, Yazd, village in Iran
 Kuhi, Tajikistan, village in Sughd Region, Tajikistan